Archetype is the fifth studio album by American heavy metal band Fear Factory. It was the first album by the band not to feature Dino Cazares, with Christian Olde Wolbers handling both bass and guitar duties. It was released on April 20, 2004, through Liquid 8. It debuted at No. 30 on the Billboard 200 chart and is their highest charting album to date.

The album was also issued in a limited edition digipak with a bonus DVD. Depending on where the digipak was obtained, the bonus DVD is either for their "Australian Tour 2004" and the video for "Cyberwaste" or one entitled "The Making of Archetype". Some, though not all, versions of the bonus digipak also included a gold ticket that gave the owner a chance to meet Fear Factory live.

Christian Olde Wolbers noted the main influences for the record were Slayer's Undisputed Attitude, Rammstein's Mutter and Mnemic's Mechanical Spin Phenomena.

Track listing

Song interpretations
"Slave Labor" contains references to the self-immolation of a person against the corporate world.
"Cyberwaste" contains references to anonymous Internet users who antagonize other users only because they are "safe behind the cyberscreen".
The title track "Archetype" is directed at then ex-guitarist Dino Cazares: "The infection has been removed/The soul of this machine has improved." Frontman Burton C. Bell stated that Archetype,' defines what Fear Factory is, completely. It has classic Fear Factory parts, and the heavy/melodic vocals, but without being forced or contrived."

Popular culture
"Bite the Hand That Bleeds" was used in the film Saw and the music video is a bonus feature on one of the versions of the DVD.
"Slave Labor" is featured on UFC: Ultimate Beat Downs, Vol. 1.
The album and its title song are referenced in the game Fallout 3 on one of the terminals, where a certain "B. Bell" reports on a terminal that the virus on the "Archetype FF06" mainframe has been cleaned, and that "the infection has been removed, the soul of this machine has improved".
A remixed version of the song "Archetype" was featured on the soundtrack to OVA Galerians: Rion.
The official music video of the song "Archetype" was featured as a bonus unlockable in Capcom's game Final Fight: Streetwise (PS2/Xbox).

Credits

Burton C. Bell − vocals, lyrics, arrangements ("Transformated")
Christian Olde Wolbers − guitars, bass, arrangements ("Transformated")
Raymond Herrera − drums
John Bechdel − live keyboards, effects ("Additional Devices") (1)
Rhys Fulber − keyboards, programming, cognitive devices (1, 6, 7, 12, 13)
Steve Tushar − keyboards, programming, cognitive devices (3–5, 8, 9, 11, 13), augmenting ("Additional Augments") (4, 5)
Roger Lian − augmenting
Shaun Thingvold − augmenting
Ken "Hi Watt" Marshall − engineer, augmenting
Jeremy Blair − engineer, augmenting
Greg Reely − mixing, augmenting
Mike Catain − executive producer, coordination
Omer "Impson" R. Cordell − photography
Fear Factory − producer, development, visual concept
Alain Francois − web design
Torsten Gebhardt − rendering
Ralph Schrader − coordination, layout design, organizer
Howie Weinberg − mastering, development

Charts
Album - Billboard (North America)

References

External links
 Official Fear Factory website

Fear Factory albums
2004 albums
Albums produced by Rhys Fulber